Robat-e Jaz Rural District is a rural district (dehestan) in the Central District of Khoshab County, Razavi Khorasan Province, Iran. At the 2006 census, its population was 3,221, in 886 families.  The rural district has 3 villages.

References 

Rural Districts of Razavi Khorasan Province
Khoshab County